Remmel Mountain, also known as Mount Remmel, is a prominent  mountain summit located in Okanogan County in Washington state. It is the highest point in the Cathedral Range, which is a subrange of the Okanogan Range in the North Cascades. Remmel is the third-highest summit of the Okanogan Range following Mount Lago (8,745 ft), and Robinson Mountain (8,726 ft). These three peaks follow Jack Mountain {9,075 ft} as the highest peaks in the Pasayten Wilderness. Remmel is the most prominent mountain in the Pasayten Wilderness. Precipitation runoff from Remmel Mountain drains into the Chewuch River basin.

History

The peak was named in 1898 by Albert Hale Sylvester, a pioneer surveyor, explorer, topographer, and forest supervisor in the Cascades who named thousands of natural features. The first ascent of the summit was made July 26, 1904, by Sledge Tatum and George E. Louden, Jr., two members of the Boundary Survey group led by Edward C. Barnard. Remmel Mountain was once topped by a gable roof single-room 14' by 14' fire lookout that was built by the Forest Service in the 1930s. The lookout was subject to heavy lightning strikes that forced its closure, and by 1969 was reported destroyed. Had it been still operating in 2001, that fire lookout would have been in a position to locate the nearby Thirtymile Fire which killed four firefighters in Chewuch Canyon.

Geology

The North Cascades features some of the most rugged topography in the Cascade Range with craggy peaks, granite spires, ridges, and deep glacial valleys. Geological events occurring many years ago created the diverse topography and drastic elevation changes over the Cascade Range leading to the various climate differences.

The history of the formation of the Cascade Mountains dates back millions of years ago to the late Eocene Epoch. With the North American Plate overriding the Pacific Plate, episodes of volcanic igneous activity persisted. In addition, small fragments of the oceanic and continental lithosphere called terranes created the North Cascades about 50 million years ago.

During the Pleistocene period dating back over two million years ago, glaciation advancing and retreating repeatedly scoured the landscape leaving deposits of rock debris. The "U"-shaped cross section of the river valleys are a result of recent glaciation. Uplift and faulting in combination with glaciation have been the dominant processes which have created the tall peaks and deep valleys of the North Cascades area.

Climate

Most weather fronts originate in the Pacific Ocean, and travel northeast toward the Cascade Mountains. As fronts approach the North Cascades, they are forced upward by the peaks of the Cascade Range, causing them to drop their moisture in the form of rain or snowfall onto the Cascades (Orographic lift). As a result, the west side of the North Cascades experiences higher precipitation than the east side, especially during the winter months in the form of snowfall. During winter months, weather is usually cloudy, but, due to high pressure systems over the Pacific Ocean that intensify during summer months, there is often little or no cloud cover during the summer.

See also

List of mountain peaks of Washington (state)
Geography of the North Cascades
Geology of the Pacific Northwest

References

External links
 Mount Remmel weather: Mountain Forecast
 Mt. Remmel rock climbing: Mountainproject.com

North Cascades
Mountains of Washington (state)
Mountains of Okanogan County, Washington
Cascade Range
North American 2000 m summits